Nuclei colliculi superioris are groups of large cells in the middle gray layer of the superior colliculus and more laterally near the midbrain tegmentum.

References

External links 
 More information at BrainInfo 

Midbrain